Ronno is a commune of the Rhône département, in France.

Demographics
In 2019, the population was 639. Inhabitants are known as Ronnis.

See also
Communes of the Rhône department

References

Communes of Rhône (department)
Beaujolais (province)